Mgr. Leo Soekoto, SJ (born in Jali, Gayamharjo, Prambanan, Sleman, 23 October 1920 - 30 December 1995) was Archbishop of Jakarta from 15 August 1970 to his death. He was appointed priest on 22 August 1953 at the age of 32 years.

Soekoto died on Saturday, 30 December 1995 in RS St. Elisabeth, Semarang from cancer of the spinal cord, and was buried in the cemetery complex area Girisonta Retreat House, Central Java.

Biography 

Soekoto was the second of three sons of village headman Gayamharjo, Wongsosentono and Soeratinah.

After finishing school he entered the Seminary Medium on the Road Code (now Jalan Abubakar Ali) Yogyakarta for six years. After graduating he entered the Society of Jesus (SJ). He started studying philosophy there, during the Second World War, and entered  the Society of Jesus in Girisonta on 7 September 1945. In 1950 he was accepted as a theology student at Maastricht, Netherlands. He studied for four years and was ordained a priest there, on 22 August 1953, followed by his final year of theology studies and future third-year novitiate.

He returned to Indonesia in 1958. In 1960 he was appointed professor of moral theology and canon law at Major Seminary of St. Paul Yogyakarta. In 1962 he was appointed Rector Seminary Yogyakarta, which is now called Institute of Philosophy-Theology.

15 November 1966 summoned to Jakarta to assist the Archbishop of Jakarta, Adrianus Djajasepoetra, as the Secretary of the archdiocese. Date 25 November 1967 was appointed Vicar General archdiocese Block B concurrently parish priest Kebayoran Baru.

On 15 August 1970 Soekoto was ordained Archbishop of Jakarta by Justin Cardinal Darmojoewono in Senayan Jakarta. In the same year, Soekoto  was elected Secretary Supreme Council of the Indonesian Bishops (MAWI).

The Pope appointed him Apostolic Administrator ad Nutum Sanctae sedis for Diocese of Bogor until 23 October 1994, when the new Bishop of Bogor, Michael Angkur was ordained.

Soekoto retired as archbishop of Jakarta on 10 November 1995, and moved to Girisonta Central Java. On 30 December 1995, he died at the age of 75 years, after leading the archdiocese for 25 years.

Coat Archbishop of Jakarta 

Soekoto chose the symbol of a shield Jakarta pictorial cross, perched upon the head of a lion roaring. Two sprigs of leaves and fruit jali edited on either side. Then a piece of ribbon that read Scio Cui Credidi. Meaning, lion head describes Leo the Great, Pope, and church scholars. "Protector and savior of the City of Rome from attack nations that have not been cultured." Jali make an analogy of a tree native-born bishop: Jali village, Village Gayamharjo. Sentence over the tape: "I know whom I have believed."

Education 

 HIS, Yogyakarta (1937)
 Minor Seminary, Yogyakarta (1943)
 High School Spiritual Life, Unggaran (1947)
 School of Philosophy, Jakarta (1950)
 School of Theology, The Netherlands (1954)
 Gregorian University in Rome (1955)
 Spirituality (Spirituality) in Muenster, West Germany (1955)
 Law of the Church in Rome (1958)

Career 

 Lecturer Seminary in Yogyakarta (1959-1966)
 Seminary Rector Yogyakarta (1962-1966)
 Secretary of the Archdiocese of Jakarta (1966-1967)
 Vicar General of the Archdiocese of Jakarta concurrently Parish Priest Block B (1967-1970)
 Archbishop of Jakarta (1970-1995)
 Secretary MAWI (1970)
 Nutum ad Apostolic Administrator for the Diocese of Bogor Sanctae sedis (1993-1994)

External links 

  A brief biography on the site Cathedral Church Jakarta
  A brief biography on the Diocese website Bogor
  Funeral of Mgr. Leo Soekoto
  Biography at Catholic Hierarchy

1920 births
1995 deaths
People from Sleman Regency
Javanese people
Indonesian Jesuits 
20th-century Roman Catholic archbishops in Indonesia
Jesuit archbishops
Pontifical Gregorian University alumni